Averkiyevo is the name of several rural localities in Russia:
Averkiyevo, Ivanovo Oblast, a village in Ilyinsky District of Ivanovo Oblast
Averkiyevo, Moscow Oblast, a village in Averkiyevskoye Rural Settlement of Pavlovo-Posadsky District in Moscow Oblast;